In Unicode, the block Old Turkic is located from U+10C00 to U+10C4F. It is used to display the Old Turkic alphabet.

History
The following Unicode-related documents record the purpose and process of defining specific characters in the Old Turkic block:

External links

Unicode blocks